Heald Green and Long Lane Ratepayers Association is a Ratepayers' Association in the Heald Green ward of the Metropolitan Borough of Stockport.

In every local election since its creation in 1927, independents sponsored by the association have held the council seats in the ward. The association has also supplied three mayors and two deputy mayors since the ward became a part of Stockport in 1974.

The association states that it does not have a manifesto or party policies, instead sponsoring councillors who live in the area to represent the community.

History
The association was formed in 1927 following the creation of the Heald Green electoral ward.

In 1962, the ratepayers' launched a community magazine named CONTACT.

The ratepayers' association would become entangled with the construction and development of runways at Manchester Airport several times through its history. As far back as April 1960, the association joined forces with the Hale Barns and Handforth ratepayer associations to spearhead opposition against the development of the new runways, due to noise pollution concerns. During a meeting of the Manchester Airport Consultative Committee, founded by the airport in 1969, the chair stated "we are watching the airport consultative committee like hawks and we shall not hesitate to give it a kick in the right place." In 1997, the group began campaigning alongside local groups such as the Manchester Airport Joint Action Group and the Stockport Campaign Against Runway Extension against the construction of Runway 2. Councillor Peter Burns made a statement on the runway in 2005, nearly four years following its construction amid local complaints: "I feel that Manchester Airport has already broken an undertaking given to residents under the flight path of this runway - and it had only been open for 102 hours." A spokesperson for Manchester Airport stated that due to debris, planes were forced to land on the second runway from the Stockport direction.

Electoral performance

References

External links
Official website

1927 establishments in England